Carlton Hylton (born 1974), better known as Ghost, is a Jamaican singjay performer. He is best known for songs such as the dancehall hit "Body Guard". He gained his first notice in 1993 singing for Clifton "Specialist" Dillon on ragga songs, partnering with DJ Culture as rapper. Ghost was a member of Monster Shack Crew in 1996. He joined Jamaican singer Tony Curtis on 1997's "Wine", produced by Classical People for Opera House Production. In 1998 he wrote "What Have You Done" with Anthony Cameron, released as a single produced by Red Rose & Malvo during sessions for their compilation album How You Fi Sey Dat?

Hylton picked up the nickname "Ghost" as a child in Kingston, Jamaica, from the reaction of other children to his appearance in head bandages after being hit by a bicycle in the road.

In 2020, Ghost released the Christian worship song "Humbly Before Thee" under the Ghetto Youths International label.

Discography
1994 – Slowly
2000 – Love You
2002 – Under the Moonlight
2007 – The Get Down
2007 – Not the American Idol!
2010 – No Limit
2011 – Stories

References

External links
Ghost discography at MusicBrainz

Jamaican reggae musicians
Jamaican male singers
1974 births
Living people
Musicians from Kingston, Jamaica
VP Records artists